Khaled Shamarikh (Arabic:خالد شماريخ) (born 7 June 1990) is an Emirati footballer. He currently plays as a defender for Al Dhaid.

External links

References

Emirati footballers
1990 births
Living people
Al Urooba Club players
Emirates Club players
Al-Ittihad Kalba SC players
Dibba FC players
Al Dhaid SC players
UAE First Division League players
UAE Pro League players
Association football defenders